The Queen Maud Mountains are a major group of mountains, ranges and subordinate features of the Transantarctic Mountains, lying between the Beardmore and Reedy Glaciers and including the area from the head of the Ross Ice Shelf to the Antarctic Plateau in Antarctica. Captain Roald Amundsen and his South Pole party ascended Axel Heiberg Glacier near the central part of this group in November 1911, naming these mountains for the Norwegian queen Maud of Wales. Despite the name, they are not located within Queen Maud Land.

Elevations bordering the Beardmore Glacier, at the western extremity of these mountains, were observed by the British expeditions led by Ernest Shackleton (1907–09) and Robert Falcon Scott (1910-13), but the mountains as a whole were mapped by several American expeditions led by Richard Evelyn Byrd (1930s and 1940s), and United States Antarctic Program (USARP) and New Zealand Antarctic Research Program (NZARP) expeditions from the 1950s through the 1970s.

Features
Geographical features include:

Barton Mountains

Bush Mountains

Commonwealth Range

Dominion Range

Gothic Mountains

Grosvenor Mountains

Hays Mountains

Herbert Range

Hughes Range

La Gorce Mountains

Prince Olav Mountains

Quarles Range

Rawson Mountains

Supporters Range

Tapley Mountains

Other features

 Amphibole Peak
 Amundsen Glacier
 Amundsen Icefall
 Anderson Ridge
 Barracouta Ridge
 Bartlett Bench
 Beck Peak
 Breyer Mesa
 Butchers Spur
 Bynum Peak
 Cascade Bluff
 Cenotaph Hill
 Chevron Rocks
 Christy Glacier
 Collinson Ridge
 Coloured Peak
 Cowie Dome
 Crack Bluff
 Crilly Hill
 Cunningham Glacier
 Curtis Peaks
 Davis Hills
 Dick Glacier
 Dunn Spur
 Epidote Peak
 Epler Glacier
 Erb Range
 Erickson Glacier
 Faulkner Escarpment
 Feeney Col
 Fernette Peak
 Ford Spur
 Forman Glacier
 Fram Mesa
 Fulgham Ridge
 Fuller Dome
 Garcia Point
 Gardner Ridge
 Gerasimou Glacier
 Gjelsvik Peak
 Goodale Glacier
 Gray Peak
 Gregory Ridge
 Haas Glacier
 Hansen Spur
 Hare Peak
 Held Glacier
 Holdsworth Glacier
 Howe Glacier
 Husky Dome
 Husky Heights
 June Nunatak
 Keel Hill
 Kitching Ridge
 Kranz Peak
 Kutschin Peak
 Layman Peak
 Lee Peak
 Lindstrøm Peak
 Liv Glacier
 McCuistion Glacier
 McDonough Nunataks
 McNally Peak
 Moffett Glacier
 Moraine Canyon
 Mount Alice Gade
 Mount Amherst
 Mount Andrews
 Mount Behling
 Mount Benjamin
 Mount Bennett
 Mount Bjaaland
 Mount Blackburn
 Mount Blood
 Mount Bowlin
 Mount Bowser
 Mount Clarke
 Mount Clough
 Mount Cole
 Mount Cope
 Mount Czegka
 Mount Danforth
 Mount Deardorff
 Mount Denauro
 Mount Dockery
 Mount Don Pedro Christophersen
 Mount Ehrenspeck
 Mount Ellsworth
 Mount Fairweather
 Mount Farley
 Mount Ferguson
 Mount Fridtjof Nansen
 Mount Gardiner
 Mount Hanssen
 Mount Harkness
 Mount Hassel
 Mount Hermanson
 Mount Innes-Taylor
 Mount Johnstone
 Mount Kendrick
 Mount Kristensen
 Mount Maloney
 Mount McKercher
 Mount Meeks
 Mount Nansen
 Mount Nelson
 Mount Noville
 Mount Orndorff
 Mount Prestrud
 Mount Przywitowski
 Mount Pulitzer
 Mount Redifer
 Mount Riley
 Mount Roland
 Mount Rosenwald
 Mount Russell
 Mount Ruth
 Mount Saltonstall
 Mount Schevill
 Mount Stubberud
 Mount Suarez
 Mount Sundbeck
 Mount Toth
 Mount Valinski
 Mount Verlautz
 Mount Warden
 Mount Wasko
 Mount Wilbur
 Mount Wisting
 Muck Glacier
 Munizaga Peak
 Nilsen Plateau
 Norway Glacier
 Olds Peak
 Olsen Crags
 Pallid Peak
 Parker Bluff
 Patterson Peak
 Pegmatite Peak
 Pendant Ridge
 Polaris Peak
 Poulter Glacier
 Price Bluff
 Rawson Mountains
 Rawson Plateau
 Red Raider Rampart
 Reedy Glacier
 Reid Spur
 Roaring Cliffs
 Robinson Bluff
 Sagehen Nunataks
 Schmidt Peak
 Scudder Mountain
 Seabee Heights
 Shackleton Glacier
 Sheridan Bluff
 Simmonds Peak
 Simplicity Hill
 Steagall Glacier
 Sverre Hassel
 Szabo Bluff
 Tate Glacier
 Taylor Nunatak
 Taylor Ridge
 Teller Peak
 Thomas Spur
 Thrinaxodon Col
 Titan Dome
 Tongue Peak
 Van Reeth Glacier
 Waldron Spurs
 Watson Escarpment
 Waugh Peak
 Webster Knob
 Witalis Peak
 Yeats Glacier

See also
 List of mountains in Queen Maud Land

References

 
Transantarctic Mountains
Mountain ranges of Marie Byrd Land
Mountain ranges of the Ross Dependency